Bonachea is a surname. Notable people with the surname include:

Oscar Poey Bonachea, Cuban scouting pioneer
Miguel Bonachea (born 1960), Cuban guitarist and professor